Donald Angus MacKenzie  (born 3 May 1950) is a Professor of Sociology at the University of Edinburgh, Scotland. His work constitutes a crucial contribution to the field of science and technology studies. He has also developed research in the field of social studies of finance. He has undertaken widely cited work on the history of statistics, eugenics, nuclear weapons, computing and finance, among other things.

In August 2006, MacKenzie was awarded the Chancellor's Award from Prince Philip, Duke of Edinburgh and Chancellor of the University of Edinburgh, for his contributions to the field of science and technology studies. He is also the winner of the 1993 Robert K. Merton Award of the American Sociological Association and the 2005 John Desmond Bernal Prize of the Society for Social Studies of Science among many others.

Books

References

External links
Donald MacKenzie's faculty homepage at the University of Edinburgh
Donald MacKenzie's contributions published in The London Review of Books (including "The Political Economy of Carbon Trading")

1950 births
Academics of the University of Edinburgh
Alumni of the University of Edinburgh
British sociologists
Economic sociologists
Fellows of the Academy of Social Sciences
Fellows of the British Academy
Fellows of the Royal Society of Edinburgh
Formal methods people
Sociologists of science
Living people